With Love and Kisses is a 1936 American musical comedy film directed by Leslie Goodwins and starring Pinky Tomlin, Toby Wing and Kane Richmond. It was produced on Poverty Row as a second feature for release by Ambassador Pictures.

Synopsis
Homer 'Spec' Higgins, a songwriter from rural Arkansas heads to New York City to make his fortune. However he is tricked by a radio star  Don Gray who steals his song and claims it as his own. Further complications ensue when Higgins is backed by an ex-racketeer to produce more hit songs, but is unable to do so without Minnie his Jersey cow from back home. He also became entangled with Blues singer Barbara Holbrook and her drunken lawyer brother.

Cast
 Pinky Tomlin as Homer 'Spec' Higgins 
 Toby Wing as Barbara Holbrook 
 Kane Richmond as Don Gray 
 Arthur Housman as Gilbert Holbrook 
 Russell Hopton as Flash Henderson 
 Jerry Bergen as himself 
 Billy Gray as himself
 Peters Sisters as Themselves
 Chelito and Gabriel as Themselves
 Fuzzy Knight as Butch
 G. Pat Collins as Joe 
 Olaf Hytten as Dickson

References

Bibliography
 Langman, Larry. Destination Hollywood: The Influence of Europeans on American Filmmaking. McFarland, 2000.
 Pitts, Michael R. Poverty Row Studios, 1929–1940. McFarland & Company, 2005.

External links
 

1936 films
1930s musical comedy-drama films
American musical comedy-drama films
Films directed by Leslie Goodwins
American black-and-white films
1936 comedy films
1936 drama films
1930s English-language films
1930s American films